Bergerac is a railway station in Bergerac, Nouvelle-Aquitaine, France. The station is located on the Libourne - Le Buisson railway line. The station is served by TER (local) services operated by SNCF. The station is 39m above sea level. It is at kilometre point 607.481 on the line from Libourne to Buisson. Formerly there was also a junction with the line to Magnac-sur-Touvre.

History

The station opened on 20 December 1875, built by the Compagnie du chemin de fer de Paris à Orléans.

Train services
The following services currently call at Bergerac:
local service (TER Nouvelle-Aquitaine) Bordeaux - Libourne - Bergerac - Sarlat-la-Canéda

References

Railway stations in France opened in 1875
Railway stations in Dordogne